The Aegidienkirche or Liebfrauenmünster St. Aegidien is the main Roman Catholic church in the German city of Braunschweig, located in the city centre. It is a hall church in the Gothic style, built to replace a Romanesque building of 1115 which burned down in 1278. It acted as the abbey church to the Benedictine abbey of saints Maria and Aegidius, endowed by Gertrude of Brunswick, and after the monastery's abolition in the Reformation it was used as a Protestant church and for secular use as the Ägidienhalle. Since 1902 part of its former monastic buildings has been used by the Braunschweigisches Landesmuseum. In 1945 it was made a Roman Catholic parish church.

Sources

Churches in Braunschweig
Churches in the Diocese of Hildesheim
Brunswick Aegidien
Brunswick Aegidien